Wabash is an unincorporated community in Cass County, Nebraska, United States.

History
A large share of the early settlers being natives of Indiana caused the name Wabash, after Wabash, Indiana, to be selected. A post office was established at Wabash in 1886, and remained in operation until it was discontinued in 1965.

References

Populated places in Cass County, Nebraska
Unincorporated communities in Nebraska